Handicapped Future is a 1971 documentary film by Werner Herzog about physically disabled children in Munich.

The film was made at the request of a disabled friend of Herzog's, specifically in order to raise awareness for the cause of the disabled in West Germany. Herzog compares the film to his earlier The Flying Doctors of East Africa in that it has very little stylization, and is, he says, "dangerously conventional." During production of Handicapped Future, Herzog met Fini Straubringer, and this meeting led directly to Herzog's more well-known film Land of Silence and Darkness.

References

External links 
 

1971 films
West German films
German short documentary films
1971 short films
1970s short documentary films
Documentary films about children with disability
1971 documentary films
1970s German films
Films about disability